= Kerderi =

Mausoleum in Kazakhstan

Coordinates: 45°43′26.6″N 60°15′41.0″E

Kerderi is a group of abandoned settlements located on the dried seafloor of what was once the Aral Sea, in Kazakhstan. Kerderi is thought to have been inhabited around the fourteenth century, when water levels were low enough to expose dry land. It is not known when Kerderi was abandoned. However, some objects from Kerderi have been carbon-dated to as late as the start of the sixteenth century and historical evidence suggests that the Aral Sea began slowly refilling after 1570, when the Amu Darya river resumed its flow into the Aral. Kerderi was completely flooded; at 1960 water levels, the settlement was inundated under 19 metres (62 ft) of water. When the Soviets diverted the Amu Darya and Syr Darya after the 1960s, the Aral retreated once more, and Kerderi became accessible for the first time in modern history. The settlements were rediscovered in 2001. They have since served as important evidence of the Aral Sea's historic changes in depth.

There are three distinct sites at Kerderi, which have been named Kerderi-1, Kerderi-2, and Aral Asar. The settlements are known for the ruins of two mausoleums. The inhabitants of Kerderi-1 had access to fresh water from the Syr Darya, which once meandered nearby. Archaeological evidence shows the inhabitants grew rice and wheat, and also raised livestock. Aral Asar drew the benefits of trade as a stop on the Silk Road.

== Sources ==
- Cretaux, Jean-François; Letolle, René; Bergé-Nguyen, Muriel (2013). "History of Aral Sea level variability and current scientific debates". Global and Planetary Change. 110: 99–113. doi:10.1016/j.gloplacha.2013.05.006.
- Krivonogov, S.K. (2009). "Extent of the Aral Sea Drop in the Middle Age". Doklady Earth Sciences. 428 (7): 1146–1150. doi:10.1134/S1028334X09070241. S2CID 129237372.
- Krivonogov, S.K.; Burr, G.S.; Kuzmin, Y.V.; Gusskov, S.A.; Kurmanbaev, R.K.; Kenshinbay, T.I.; Voyakin, D.A. (1 March 2014). "The fluctuating Aral Sea: A multidisciplinary-based history of the last two thousand years". Gondwana Research. 26: 284–300. doi:10.1016/j.gr.2014.02.004. Archived from the original on 8 June 2020.
